The 1889 East Coast by-election was a by-election held on 13 December 1889 in the  electorate during the 10th New Zealand Parliament.

The by-election was caused by the resignation of the incumbent MP Andrew Graham.

He was replaced by Alexander Creighton Arthur. William Lee Rees again stood, and came second.

Results
The following table gives the election result:

References

East Coast 1889
1889 elections in New Zealand
Politics of the Bay of Plenty Region
December 1889 events